The UK Albums Chart is one of many music charts compiled by the Official Charts Company that calculates the best-selling albums of the week in the United Kingdom. Before 2004, the chart was only based on the sales of physical albums. This list shows albums that peaked in the Top 10 of the UK Albums Chart during 2001, as well as albums which peaked in 2000 and 2002 but were in the top 10 in 2001. The entry date is when the album appeared in the top ten for the first time (week ending, as published by the Official Charts Company, which is six days after the chart is announced).

One-hundred and thirty-one albums were in the top ten this year. One album from 1999 and sixteen albums from 2000 remained in the top 10 for several weeks at the beginning of the year, while All Rise by Blue, Read My Lips by Sophie Ellis-Bextor and Songs in A Minor by Alicia Keys were all released in 2001 but did not reach their peak until 2002. Chocolate Starfish and the Hot Dog Flavored Water by Limp Bizkit, Onka's Big Moka by Toploader and White Ladder by David Gray were the albums from 2000 to reach their peak in 2001. Thirteen artists scored multiple entries in the top 10 in 2001. Alicia Keys, Destiny's Child, Gorillaz, Muse and Sophie Ellis-Bextor were among the many artists who achieved their first UK charting top 10 album in 2001.

The 2000 Christmas number-one album, 1 by The Beatles, remained at the top spot for the first two weeks of 2001. The Greatest Hits by Texas replaced it at number-one for a single week to add to its other week at number-one from October 2000. The first new number-one album of the year was Chocolate Starfish and the Hot Dog Flavored Water by Limp Bizkit. Overall, twenty-five different albums peaked at number-one in 2001, with twenty-five unique artists hitting that position.

Background

Multiple entries
One-hundred and thirty-one albums charted in the top 10 in 2001, with one-hundred and fourteen albums reaching their peak this year (including, Songbird which charted previously but reached a peak on its latest chart run).

Thirteen artists scored multiple entries in the top 10 in 2001. Westlife had the most entries this year with three. Bee Gees, Bob Dylan, David Gray, Destiny's Child, Five, Gabrielle, Limp Bizkit, Madonna, Paul McCartney, Robbie Williams, Rod Stewart, and S Club 7 were the acts who had two top 10 albums this year. Bee Gees, Bob Dylan, Destiny's Child, Five and Rod Stewart's two entries were both released this year.

Chart debuts
Thirty-six artists achieved their first top 10 album in 2001 as a lead artist. Destiny's Child had one other entry in their breakthrough year.

The following table (collapsed on desktop site) does not include acts who had previously charted as part of a group and secured their first top 10 solo album, or featured appearances on compilations or other artists recordings. 
 

Notes
Emma Bunton's debut solo album, A Girl Like Me peaked at number four this year. As part of the Spice Girls she had recorded two chart topping albums to date (Spice and Spiceworld) and a third album, Forever, which reached number two. Her former bandmate Victoria Beckham also reached the top 10 for the first time as a solo artist with her self-titled collection. Wet Wet Wet frontman Marti Pellow scored a top 10 album with his debut solo, peaking at number 7 with Smile.

Soundtracks
The only film soundtrack album to reach the top 10 this year was Glitter by Mariah Carey, from the film of the same name.

Best-selling albums
Dido had the best-selling album of the year with No Angel. The album spent fifty-three weeks in the top 10 (including seven weeks at number one), sold over 1.92 million copies and was certified 7× platinum by the BPI. Swing When You're Winning by Robbie Williams came in second place. David Gray's White Ladder, Just Enough Education to Perform from Stereophonics and Dreams Can Come True, Greatest Hits Vol. 1 by Gabrielle made up the top five. Albums by Steps, Travis, Eva Cassidy, Destiny's Child and Kylie Minogue were also in the top ten best-selling albums of the year.

Top-ten albums
Key

Entries by artist
The following table shows artists who achieved two or more top 10 entries in 2001, including albums that reached their peak in 2000. The figures only include main artists, with featured artists and appearances on compilation albums not counted individually for each artist. The total number of weeks an artist spent in the top ten in 2001 is also shown.

Notes

 Read My Lips reached its peak of number two on 29 June 2002 (week ending).
 Songs in A Minor reached its peak of number six on 30 March 2002 (week ending).
 All Rise reached its peak of number one on 4 May 2002 (week ending).
 Westlife re-entered the top 10 at number 3 on 20 January 2001 (week ending).
 Chocolate Starfish and the Hotdog re-entered the top 10 at number 8 on 20 January 2001 (week ending) for 7 weeks.
 Born to Do It re-entered the top 10 at number 10 on 27 January 2001 (week ending) and at number 8 on 10 March 2001 (week ending) for 2 weeks.
 Onka's Big Moka re-entered the top 10 at number 10 on 13 January 2001 (week ending) for 10 weeks.
 Not That Kind re-entered the top 10 at number 8 on 12 May 2001 (week ending) for 2 weeks and at number 10 on 9 June 2001 (week ending).
 All That You Can't Leave Behind re-entered the top 10 at number 7 on 10 February 2001 (week ending) for 7 weeks.
 2001 re-entered the top 10 at number 8 on 10 February 2001 (week ending) for 2 weeks.
 Songbird originally peaked outside the top 10 at number 78 upon its initial release in 1999. It re-entered the top 10 at number 5 on 25 August 2001 (week ending) for 2 weeks.
 Wheatus re-entered the top 10 at number 10 on 21 July 2001 (week ending).
 White Ladder re-entered the top 10 at number 7 on 10 March 2001 (week ending) for 7 weeks and at number 8 on 21 July 2001 (week ending) for 12 weeks.
 All Rise re-entered the top 10 at number 7 on 30 March 2002 (week ending) for 2 weeks.
 Just Enough Education to Perform re-entered the top 10 at number 4 on 5 January 2002 (week ending) for 10 weeks.
 Sunshine re-entered the top 10 at number 8 on 2 March 2002 (week ending). 
 World of Our Own re-entered the top 10 at number 7 on 23 February 2002 (week ending) for 4 weeks.
 No Angel re-entered the top 10 at number 7 on 5 January 2002 (week ending) for 6 weeks, at number 9 on 23 February 2002 (week ending) for 5 weeks and at number 8 on 6 July 2002 (week ending) for 2 weeks.
 Gold - The Greatest Hits re-entered the top 10 at number 8 on 5 January 2002 (week ending) for 2 weeks.
 Their Greatest Hits - The Record re-entered the top 10 at number 6 on 29 December 2001 (week ending) for 2 weeks.
 Read My Lips re-entered the top 10 at number 9 on 12 January 2002 (week ending) for 5 weeks and at number 2 on 29 June 2002 (week ending) for 5 weeks.
 Songs in A Minor re-entered the top 10 at number 10 on 19 January 2002 (week ending) for 2 weeks and at number 8 on 23 March 2002 (week ending) for 4 weeks.
 Whoa, Nelly! re-entered the top 10 at number 6 on 26 January 2002 (week ending).
 The Ultimate Collection re-entered the top 10 at number 9 on 19 May 2001 (week ending) and at number 8 on 23 June 2001 (week ending).
 The Greatest Hits re-entered the top 10 at number 10 on 31 March 2001 (week ending).
 Fever re-entered the top 10 at number 8 on 23 February 2002 (week ending) for 5 weeks, at number 10 on 6 April 2002 (week ending), at number 10 on 18 May 2002 (week ending) for 3 weeks and at number 9 on 22 June 2002 (week ending) for 4 weeks.
 A Funk Odyssey re-entered the top 10 at number 9 on 16 March 2002 (week ending) for 4 weeks.
 Britney re-entered the top 10 at number 10 on 27 April 2002 (week ending).
 Lickin' on Both Sides re-entered the top 10 at number 10 on 6 July 2002 (week ending).
 Figure includes album that peaked in 2000.
 Figure includes album that first charted in 2000 but peaked in 2001.

See also
2001 in British music
List of number-one albums from the 2000s (UK)

References
General

Specific

External links
2001 album chart archive at the Official Charts Company (click on relevant week)

United Kingdom top 10 albums
Top 10 albums
2001